Jogeswar Bhumij (born 1 July 1992) is an Indian cricketer. He made his Twenty20 debut for Assam in the 2015–16 Syed Mushtaq Ali Trophy on 10 January 2016.

References

External links
 

1992 births
Living people
Indian cricketers
Assam cricketers
People from Assam